Podborek is a village in Świętokrzyskie Voivodeship, south-central Poland.

Podborek may also refer to:
Podborek (Piwonin), part of the village of Piwonin in Masovian Voivodeship (east-central Poland)
Podborek (Śniadków Górny A), part of the village of Śniadków Górny A in Masovian Voivodeship (east-central Poland)